American Studies Leipzig is the name used for the research and teaching institution for American Studies at University of Leipzig. A transdisciplinary institute focussing on literature and cultural studies, it is the largest institute for American Studies in Eastern Germany.

Significance

Academia
American Studies Leipzig is the fastest-growing institute for American Studies in Germany that is not located in Berlin. In 2003, the Fulbright Commission endowed a newly created Distinguished Chair guest professorship, after the CHE research and education thinktank, part of Bertelsmann Foundation, had attested the institute extraordinary quality.

In September 2005, the DAAD further distinguished the institute by creating the DAAD Distinguished Chair for American and International Studies guest professorship. This was intended to honor and further facilitate the institute's eagerness to innovation and its dedication to transatlantic studies.

In 2006, the institute succeeded in winning its third guest professorship in only four years. The Picador Chair for Literature is the outcome of a series of events by Georg von Holtzbrinck Publishing Group in cooperation with DAAD. Its purpose is to invite young English-speaking authors to live, write and teach in Leipzig. Thus, American Studies Leipzig is the only German institute for American studies supplementing its program of literary studies teaching with the perspective of actual creative artists, regularly.

Furthermore, the institute features the largest research corpus on the New Deal in a German university.

Beyond Academia
Extra to its meaning for the University of Leipzig, the institute is a component of the cultural scenery of the city of Leipzig. Featuring regular public readings by American authors, public events like the HipHop Awareness Week and continuing education of Gymnasium teachers, the institute is a steady component of the general public and educational landscape in Leipzig and its surrounding region.

For issues of American culture and politics, the institute is an important counterpart for regional and national media, who regularly ask members of the institute for commentary concerning current proceedings in the US.

Main research 
The programs of American Studies Leipzig focus especially on cultural and literary studies of the United States. This emphasis is supplemented by the institute's teaching of American English, regular guest lectures (such as the Fulbright Lecture Series), exchange programs with US universities (among others: Mount Holyoke College, University of Miami and Ohio University) and study trips to the US.

Research at the institute focusses on Ethnic group, Gender, Immigration to the United States and Popular culture studies.

Established 1997 and supported by donations, Frank Freidel Memorial Library features about 15'000 books and periodicals with a topical focus on the New Deal.

External links 
 Homepage des American Studies Institute
 American Studies Alumni Association
 Becker, Anja. "Geschichte der Amerikanistik".

References 

Leipzig University
American studies